TransMilenio is a bus rapid transit (BRT) system that serves Bogotá, the capital of Colombia, and Soacha. The system opened to the public in December 2000, covering Caracas Avenue and 80 street. Other lines were added gradually over the next several years, and as of 2022, 12 lines totalling  run throughout the city. It is part of the city's Integrated Public Transport System (Sistema Integrado de Transporte Público [SITP] in Spanish), along with the urban, complementary and special bus services operating on neighbourhoods and main streets.

It was inspired by Curitiba's Rede Integrada de Transporte (Integrated Transportation Network). TransMilenio consists of several interconnected BRT lines, with raised floor stations in the center of a main avenue, or "troncal". Passengers typically reach the stations via a bridge over the street. Usually four lanes down the center of the street are dedicated to bus traffic. The outer lanes allow express buses to bypass buses stopped at a station.

Users pay at the station entrance using a smart card, pass through a turnstile, and wait for buses inside the station, which is typically 5 m wide. The bus and station doors open simultaneously, and passengers board by simply walking across the threshold. The elevated station platform and the bus floor are at the same height.

In the beginning most buses were diesel-powered, purchased from such manufacturers as the Colombian-Brazilian company Marcopolo-Superior, German conglomerate Mercedes-Benz, and Swedish companies such as Volvo and Scania. The buses were articulated and had a capacity of 160 passengers each. In May 2007, a new, larger bi-articulated bus, with capacity for 270 passengers, was presented to the public. TransMilenio buses are not equipped with transponders to give them priority at traffic signals; regret over this fact was voiced by former general manager of the system, Angelica Castro.

As of the 4th quarter of 2021, 1,759 buses on average were circulating on the trunk line system. An additional set of 800 regular buses, known as "feeders" (alimentadores in Spanish), carry passengers from certain important stations to many different locations that the main route does not reach. Unlike the main TransMilenio buses, feeders operate without dedicated lanes, are not articulated and are either green or blue (regular TransMilenio buses are red). There is no additional fare to use the feeder buses.

There are 22 bicycle parking facilities in main TransMilenio stations with 6,059 parking spaces to facilitate cyclists using the system.

8 BRT corridors were certified in 2013 to meet the BRT STANDARD with excellence: Autonorte and Caracas silver, Americas, Calle 80, Eldorado, NQS and Suba gold.

History
Before TransMilenio, Bogotá's mass transit "system" consisted of thousands of independently operated and uncoordinated mini buses. There was also a plan for a network of elevated highways throughout Bogotá, and plans to build a subway as Medellín had done seven years prior. When Enrique Peñalosa was elected mayor he cancelled these projects and oversaw the construction of the initial TransMilenio system at a fraction of the cost.

Within three years after the initiation of the project, the first phase opened in December 2000. A second phase has been completed, and a third is underway. Prior to construction, a 30 km trip by public transport would take 2 hours and 15 minutes in 1998; the same trip using TransMilenio now takes 55 minutes.

The mayor created a special company to build the project and run the central system.  The operational design of TransMilenio was undertaken by transport consultants Steer Davies Gleave with the financial structuring of the project led by Capitalcorp S.A., a local investment bank.  Most of the money required to build TransMilenio was provided by the Colombian central government, while the city of Bogotá provided the remaining 30%.

Other cities are building systems modelled on Transmilenio, for example, Mexico City, and Transantiago in Santiago, Chile, but the difference is that in these cities the system is complemented with a Rapid transit system.

TransMilenio stations comply with easy access regulations because they are elevated and have ramps leading to the entrance. The alimentadores (feeders) are normal buses without handicapped accessibility. A lawsuit by disabled user Daniel Bermúdez caused a ruling that all feeder systems must comply with easy access regulations by 2004, but this has not happened yet.

2006 protests
On May 2 and 3, 2006, several groups of bus drivers not associated with TransMilenio held a strike, protesting against some elements and consequences of the system. They disagreed with the amount of monetary compensation that they would receive in exchange for the disposal of old buses (10 to more than 20 years old), traffic restrictions on the TransMilenio main lines, and a new Pico y Placa Ambiental in some city areas, that would restrict the schedules of buses older than 10 years to early morning hours to reduce pollution in the city.

Some of the larger bus companies which participate in TransMilenio also retired their conventional bus lines during the strike. Public transportation ground to a halt in much of the city. Although TransMilenio and a number of other buses continued operating, they could not cope with all of the demand. Acts of individual intimidation and violence against some private vehicles, TransMilenio and conventional buses occurred during the strike, as well as clashes between some of the strikers and the police.

Bogotá's Mayor Luis Eduardo Garzón condemned the strike, firmly defended all of the measures as necessary for the city's transportation future, and stated that he was only willing to discuss the specific details of their implementation, as well as a further democratization of TransMilenio's operations, after the situation calmed down. During the second and final day of the strike, the local administration, the strikers and their companies agreed to begin talks.

During the strike, some protests included users of TransMilenio who complained because the buses were passing at a very low frequency. Several stations became so filled up that some people fell from them into the street. Even after the strike ended, some TransMilenio passengers have subsequently protested because they still find aspects of the system to be inefficient and uncomfortable.

2012 protests
Due to the relatively high price, overcrowding, and delays in the routes hundreds of people mostly students protested and some vandals looted and broke windows on March 9, 2012, causing half a million dollars of damage and 11 injuries. The vandals were confronted and detained by riot police.

Infrastructure

TransMilenio has 12 lines serving 152 stations in the cities of Bogotá and Soacha:
   Caracas between Calle 76 and Tercer Milenio: 14 stations
   Autonorte between Terminal and Héroes: 17 stations
   Suba between Portal de Suba and San Martín: 14 stations
   Calle 80 between Portal de la 80 and Polo: 14 stations
   NQS Central between La Castellana and Tygua - San José: 13 stations
   Américas between Portal de Las Américas and Avenida Jiménez: 18 stations (including Ricaurte station)
   NQS Sur between Comuneros and San Mateo: 17 stations
   Caracas Sur between Hospital and Portal de Usme and Portal del Tunal: 16 stations
   Eje Ambiental between Museo del Oro and Universidades: 3 stations
   Calle 26, between Portal Eldorado and Centro Memoria: 13 stations
   Carrera Décima between Portal 20 de Julio and San Diego: 10 stations
   Carrera Séptima: Museo Nacional: 1 station

Since the May 2006 expansion, the TransMilenio route system has changed dramatically, with new sections added to the system. Instead of being numbered, routes have a combination of letters and numbers. In order to fill the information gap, TransMilenio made available an interactive guide that includes routes, stations, nearby places and route combinations.

New lines have been constructed, including one on Calle 26 (Downtown-West (Airport)) and the other on Carrera 10 (Downtown-South).

Construction of a new line in Carrera 7 (North-Downtown) is under consideration. This has been criticized as there are certain locations where the system might not fit.

There are six types of stations:
 Sencillas (Simple): local service stations, located approximately every 500 m
 De transferencia (Transfer): allow transfer between different lines through a tunnel
 Sin intercambio (No transfer): do not allow transfer between lanes (north-south, south-north, west-east, east-west); located in the Autopista Norte (due a stretch of the way), Tunal and 6th Street ramification (due water channels).
 Intermedias (Intermediate): service both feeder and trunk line.
 Cabecera (Portal): near the entrances to the city. In addition to feeders and articulated buses, intercity buses from the metropolitan area also arrive at these stations.
 Paraderos bus dual (dual-bus stop): located in the streets, these stops don't have turnstiles, electronic boards and the floor level is the same of the street; served by buses with station-level and street-level doors. These stops are located in the pretrunk corridors (AK 7, AV Caracas, AV Suba, AC 80, AV El Dorado).
All stations have electronic boards announcing the approximate arrival time of the next bus.  Wait times are short as there is usually a bus serving the station. There are also station attendants to provide assistance to the passengers, and posted system maps.

Older services

 
 
The trunk system had three types of services: 
 The Regular (Corriente) stopped at all stations.
 The Express (Expresos) only stopped at the stations determined in its route.
 The Super Express (Super Expresos) was established since the end of 2005 by the expansion of the system. Of these there were two classes:
 The Asymmetric (Asimetrico) covered the system in one direction. The 201 and 300 went from north to south and the 200 and 301 went from south to north. These services were only in service at peak hours in the morning and evening according to their color.
 The Symmetrical (Simetrico) traversed the system in both directions, as route 400.
 The Sunday Express (Expreso Dominical) operated only on Sundays and holidays.

Current services 

After the total operation of the second phase of the system was implemented, a new system was implemented to facilitate the circulation of the system. The zoning divides the trunks into 12 lines or zones that have different letters and colors. The maps changed at each station, to show the specific services to the station in question and the way to reach the other zones of the system from there.

The Sunday services that were numbered from 90 to 99 (B90-G90, C91-F91, B92-H92, B93-H93, B94-D94, D95-J95, C96-G96, K97-L97, K98-G98 and M99-F99). ) were eliminated except for the K98-G98, which was modified to be renamed K42-G42 with bi-articulated buses operating in the same way. A week later they were replaced by express routes that operated only from Monday to Saturday. This had previously been done with expresses such as D22-G22 and M47-G47.

As of March 3, 2018 some services modified their nomenclatures so that they have the same number in both directions, avoiding confusions in the express routes. For example: The service that leaves between the station Toberín and the Portal de Usme went from being B72-H61 to B72-H72, likewise the D24-J24 (before it was D70-J24).

The trunk system has three types of services:
 Regular Routes (Ruta Fácil): These are the numbered routes from 1 to 9 that stop at all stations and work all day. As of August 2008, this type of service was called the Easy Route. On June 17, 2017 these services were modified, replacing the routes that operated since 2006 by shorter trails, in addition to a change of nomenclature, which did not include the letter and the color of the destination area. 
 Express (Expreso): Routes that only stop at the stations determined in their route, and are numbered from 10 to 75.
 Dual bus trunk (Troncal Bus Dual): Routes to extend the TransMilenio trunk service to arteries, beginning with the Carrera Séptima.

Fares and tickets
The fare in 2022 is 2,650 Colombian pesos for a single trip (about €0.6 or US$0.7). Cards use a contactless smart card (MIFARE) system, and multiple trips may be purchased using one card.

Costs, ridership, and impact
According to a United States Transportation Research Board (TRB) case study report, the initial construction cost for the first phase of $8 million per mile (41 km) was US $240 million, or US $5.9 million/km. In a report presented later by the Ministry of Transport of Colombia, the total cost of the construction of Transmilenio phase one was estimated at 1.4 billion COP (about US$703 million), of which 253.053 million COP (about US$126.5 million) was provided by the Colombian government. The construction of the phase two was estimated at 3.2 billion COP (about US$1634 million), of which 2.1 billion COP (about US$1058 million) was provided by the Colombian government and the rest was provided by the city. The numbers of this report are calculated in money of 2009.

The system is overseen by a public body, which awards contracts to private bus companies on a competitive basis. According to TRB, private contractors are paid based on the total number of kilometers that their vehicles operate.

Daily ridership quickly reached 800,000 after the system opened. TransMilenio has since been expanded. Ridership in early 2006 was 1,050,000 daily, in 2009 it was 1,400,000 daily and in September 2018 it was 2.4 million on a weekday.

There is a plan in the near future to build 57 km of route by creating more lines and extending some of the current ones, as well as improving some stations. However, this plan was not well received by the citizenship in 2014; according to surveys made in the city, 42% of the citizens considered that building a rapid transit system should be a priority in order to solve the mobility problem of the city, while 23% considered that more Transmilenio lines should be built.

Although most Bogotans had found Transmilenio to be an improvement over previous bus service, finding the system faster than traditional buses, many felt unsatisfied with it. Of the 37% who use the system on a daily basis, only 19% were satisfied with it. When asked about problems, many complained about overcrowded buses and stations, pickpockets long wait times and sexual assaults as problems. In the year 2014 the system had even been ranked as the "most dangerous transport for women".

Controversies

In 2016, Transmilenio had an 86% disapproval rating from users. User strikes erupted over bad service quality, with users blocking bus lanes and at times halting the entire system. These protests sometimes devolved into riots involving heavy police presence and the use of crowd control measures such as tear gas and water cannons.

The system was described by users, independent bodies and the media as suffering from overcrowding with an average of eight passengers per square meter, insecurity and providing bad customer service. During rush hours, "stations are so packed that people can't get off the bus". In some stations the overcrowding was so severe that users had to wait in a long line to top up the Smart card and in another line to enter the station. According to official data in 2017, there were 3404 thefts in TransMilenio stations and 1442 more on buses.

The bad image and quality of the system caused an increase in the number of cars and motorcycles in the city. Citizens preferred these means of transport over the TransMilenio. According to official data, the number of cars increased from approximately 666,000 in 2005 to 1,586,700 in 2016; the number of motorcycles also grew. 660,000 were sold in Bogota in 2013, twice the number of cars sold.

During construction there were problems with the concrete used to pave the dedicated roads, which had an estimated cost to the city of 1.6 trillion pesos (500 million dollars). In 2012 Bogota's secretary of finance said that the whole line of Avenida Caracas should be rebuilt as well as some parts of the Avenida 26 line.

Air pollution
In 2015 a study made by the National University of Colombia revealed that 70% of the air pollution near Transmilenio exits was caused by the buses of the first phase. According to official data, more than 50% of the first and second phase buses were hazardous for the environment because they broke atmospheric emissions rules. There was also a big controversy around the fact that the Transmilenio buses were diesel-powered  Some academics, councillors and citizens called the buses dangerous since diesel fuels were carcinogens according to the World Health Organization, and pointed out calls to ban them in other cities like Stuttgart and Stockholm.

Sexual assaults
Women in Bogotá have stated that the overcrowding in the system makes it easy for criminals to attack women and go unnoticed. According to a 2012 survey conducted by the Secretary for Women's Issues of Bogotá, 64% of women said they have been victims of sexual assault in the system. Several policies have been adopted in order to confront this problem, like an exclusive bus for women, and special undercover policewomen, but none of them have been effective against the problem, and sexual assaults continue to occur in 2018.

Broken buses
In 2017 and 2018 many incidents with Transmilenio buses had been reported while they were operating. There had been cases of buses being burned due to mechanical problems, one bus broken in half, tires flying off the buses and hitting cars, and users reporting that water leaks into the buses when it rains.

New fleet
At the end of 2018 Transmilenio ordered 1383 new buses as a replacement of the older ones in service. 52% were compressed natural gas (CNG) buses made by Scania with Euro 6 emission rating, 48% were diesel engine made by Volvo with Euro 5 emission rating. More orders have produced an impressive result: "To improve public and environmental health, the City of Bogotá has assembled a fleet of 1,485 electric buses for its public transportation system—placing the city among the three largest e-bus fleets outside of China."

Bogotá Wins Sustainable Transport Award
In 2005 a diverse group of organizations joined their efforts to promote sustainable mobility around the globe by highlighting best practices and showcase real-life examples of transportation projects in cities and this way addressing climate change, equity, and resilience.

The group established the Sustainable Transport Award, along with its Committee, which identifies cities that are leading in this field.

"The first winning city was Bogotá, thanks to their BRT system and urban cycling strategy.
Now, seventeen years since the STA’s founding, Bogotá has won the Award once again, thanks to their swift adaptation to the unique mobility demands posed by the pandemic. In this way, Bogotá has been a true model for vigilance, resilience, and responsiveness in the face of great change."

See also
 List of bus rapid transit systems
 TransMiCable
 Transjakarta

References

External links 

 Official website of TransMilenio 
 Bogota's New Transit System, a TransMilenio slideshow by the New York Times
 The Economics of TransMilenio, an economic analysis of Bogotá's BRT system

 
2000 introductions
Transport in Bogotá
Bus rapid transit in Colombia